was a Japanese film production company created in 1982 to provide a venue outside the major studio system for young proven filmmakers to grow artistically. The company's president, Susumu Miyasaka, came from an advertising and public relations background and he was joined by founding members Kazuhiko Hasegawa, Toshiharu Ikeda, Sōgo Ishii, Kazuyuki Izutsu, Kiyoshi Kurosawa, Kichitaro Negishi, Kazuki Ōmori, Shinji Sōmai and Banmei Takahashi, none of them older than 36 years of age.

For distribution of its works, the group maintained links with major companies such as Nikkatsu, Kadokawa Pictures and Art Theatre Guild, as well as the smaller firms New Century Producers and Kitty Films. The company dissolved due to bankruptcy in 1992, ten years after its foundation. The organization provided a means for several of its members to leave the fading prospects of the Roman porno genre of pink film at Nikkatsu and enter mainstream filmmaking.

Major works
   (1982, Banmei Takahashi)
 Kandagawa Pervert Wars (1983, Kiyoshi Kurosawa)
 The Crazy Family (1984, Sōgo Ishii)
 Mermaid Legend (1984, Toshiharu Ikeda)
 Love Hotel (1985, Shinji Sōmai)
 Typhoon Club (1985, Shinji Sōmai)
  (1985, Toshiharu Ikeda)
 House of Wedlock (1986, Kichitaro Negishi)
 Inuji ni Seshi Mono (1986, Kazuyuki Izutsu)
 Halber Mensch (1986, Sōgo Ishii)
 Eien no 1/2 (1987, Kichitaro Negishi)
 Evil Dead Trap (1988, Toshiharu Ikeda)

References

Film production companies of Japan
Companies established in 1982
1982 establishments in Japan